Karolline Rosa Cavedo (born December 30, 1994) is a Brazilian mixed martial artist. A professional since 2012, she currently competes in the Bantamweight division in the Ultimate Fighting Championship (UFC).  As of October 3, 2022, she is #9 in the UFC women's bantamweight rankings.

Background
Rosa started training Brazilian jiu-jitsu at the age of 13, winning multiple international competitions in the sport before transitioning to mixed martial arts at the age of 17.

Mixed martial arts career

Early career
Starting her career in 2012, Rosa compiled a 11–3 record fighting for a wide variety of regional Brazilian promotions, most notably fighting for the Watch Out Combat Show Featherweight Championship against Professional Fighters League finalist Larissa Pacheco, which Rosa lost by guillotine choke.

Ultimate Fighting Championship
Rosa made her UFC debut against	Lara Procópio at UFC Fight Night: Andrade vs. Zhang on August 31, 2019. She won a close back and forth fight by split decision.

Rosa was expected to face Julia Avila on October 26, 2019 at UFC Fight Night: Maia vs. Askren. The fight was later cancelled due to a knee injury from Rosa. The match was rescheduled to April 11, 2020 at UFC Fight Night: Overeem vs. Harris. Due to the COVID-19 pandemic, the event was eventually postponed. The pair was rescheduled to meet on May 2, 2020 at UFC Fight Night 174. However, on April 9, Dana White, the president of UFC announced that the event too was postponed to June 13, 2020. Eventually, Rosa withdrew from the bout and was replaced by Gina Mazany.

Rosa faced Vanessa Melo at UFC 251 on July 11, 2020. Melo weighed in at 141 pounds, five pounds over the bantamweight non-title fight limit. Rosa won the fight via unanimous decision.

Rosa was expected to replace Macy Chiasson against Sijara Eubanks at UFC Fight Night: Overeem vs. Sakai on September 5, 2020. Rosa pulled out on September 3 due to complications related to her weight cut.

Rosa was scheduled to face Nicco Montaño on February 6, 2021 at UFC Fight Night: Overeem vs. Volkov. However, in the weeks leading up the fight, Montaño was pulled from the event due to undisclosed reasons and replaced by Joselyne Edwards. Rosa won the fight via unanimous decision.

Rosa was scheduled to face Sijara Eubanks on June 12, 2021 at UFC 263. However, Rosa pulled out of the fight in late-May citing an injury. In turn, Eubanks was removed from the card and will face Priscila Cachoeira six weeks later at UFC Fight Night 192 instead.

Rosa faced Bethe Correia on October 2, 2021 at UFC Fight Night 193.  At the weigh-ins, Correia weighed in at 138.5 pounds, two pounds and a half pounds over the women's bantamweight non-title fight limit. The bout proceeded at catchweight and Correia was fined 20% which went to Rosa. She won the fight via unanimous decision.

Rosa faced Sara McMann on March 26, 2022 at UFC on ESPN 33. She lost the fight by unanimous decision.

Rosa faced Lina Länsberg at UFC 280 in Abu Dhabi on October 22, 2022. She won the bout via majority decision.

Rosa is scheduled to face Norma Dumont April 22, 2023 at UFC Fight Night 222.

Mixed martial arts record 
 

|-
|Win
|align=center|16–4
|Lina Länsberg
|Decision (majority)
|UFC 280
|
|align=center|3
|align=center|5:00
|Abu Dhabi, United Arab Emirates
|
|-
| Loss
| align=center| 15–4
|Sara McMann
|Decision (unanimous)
|UFC on ESPN: Blaydes vs. Daukaus
|
|align=center|3
|align=center|5:00
|Columbus, Ohio, United States
|
|-
| Win
| align=center| 15–3
| Bethe Correia
| Decision (unanimous)
| UFC Fight Night: Santos vs. Walker
| 
| align=center|3
| align=center|5:00
| Las Vegas, Nevada, United States
| 
|-
| Win
| align=center| 14–3
| Joselyne Edwards
| Decision (unanimous)
| UFC Fight Night: Overeem vs. Volkov
| 
| align=center|3
| align=center|5:00 
| Las Vegas, Nevada, United States
| 
|-
|Win
|align=center| 13–3
|Vanessa Melo
|Decision (unanimous)
|UFC 251
|
|align=center|3
|align=center|5:00
|Abu Dhabi, United Arab Emirates
|
|-
| Win
| align=center| 12–3
| Lara Procópio
| Decision (split)
| UFC Fight Night: Andrade vs. Zhang
| 
| align=center| 3
| align=center| 5:00
| Shenzhen, China
| 
|-
| Win
| align=center| 11–3
| Gisele Moreira
| TKO (punches)
| HCC The Start 4
| 
| align=center| 3
| align=center| 4:21
| São Paulo, Brazil
|
|-
| Win
| align=center| 10–3
| Tamires Vidal
| Submission (arm-triangle choke)
| MMA Brutus 1
| 
| align=center| 3
| align=center| 1:40
| Rio de Janeiro, Brazil
|
|-
| Loss
| align=center|9–3
| Melissa Gatto
| Submission (kimura)
| Nação Cyborg 3
| 
| align=center|1
| align=center|4:19
| Curitiba, Brazil
|
|-
| Win
| align=center|9–2
| Tamara Leorde
| TKO (retirement)
| FK MMA: Favela Kombat 29
| 
| align=center|3
| align=center|2:18
| Rio de Janeiro, Brazil
|
|-
| Loss
| align=center|8–2
| Larissa Pacheco
| Submission (guillotine choke)
| Watch Out Combat Show 49
| 
| align=center|2
| align=center|2:59
| Rio de Janeiro, Brazil
|
|-
| Win
| align=center|8–1
| Nayara Rodrigues
| TKO (corner stoppage)
| Buzios Fight Night
| 
| align=center|2
| align=center|5:00
| Armação dos Búzios, Brazil
|
|-
| Win
| align=center| 7–1
| Diana Morais
| Submission (armbar)
| New Corpore Extreme 16: NCE Ladies
| 
| align=center|2
| align=center|4:30
| Rio Bonito, Brazil
| 
|-
| Win
| align=center| 6–1
| Sidy Rocha
| Decision (unanimous)
| Curitiba Top Fight 11: Girls' Night
| 
| align=center| 3
| align=center| 5:00
|Curitiba, Brazil
| 
|-
| Loss
| align=center| 5–1
| Gisele Moreira
| Decision (majority)
| Aspera FC 50
| 
| align=center| 3
| align=center| 5:00
| São José do Calçado, Brazil
| 
|-
| Win
| align=center| 5–0
| Mariana Morais
| Decision (unanimous)
| The Start Combat 4
| 
| align=center| 3
| align=center| 5:00
| Vila Velha, Brazil
| 
|-
| Win
| align=center| 4–0
| Jéssica Andrade
| Decision (unanimous)
| Capixaba Fight
| 
| align=center| 3
| align=center| 5:00
| Guarapari, Brazil
| 
|-
| Win
| align=center| 3–0
| Mylena Duarte
| TKO (punches and knees)
| Haidar Capixaba Combat 13
|  
| align=center| 1
| align=center| 0:39
| Vila Velha, Brazil
|
|-
| Win
| align=center| 2–0
| Tatiane Aguiar
| Decision (unanimous)
| Haidar Capixaba Combat 11
| 
| align=center| 3
| align=center| 5:00
| Vitória, Brazil
|
|-
| Win
| align=center|1–0
| Thiara Borgth
| Decision (unanimous)
| Haidar Capixaba Combat 9
| 
| align=center|3
| align=center|5:00
| Vitória, Brazil
|
|-

See also 
 List of current UFC fighters
 List of female mixed martial artists

References

External links 
 
 

Living people
1994 births
Brazilian female mixed martial artists
Bantamweight mixed martial artists
Featherweight mixed martial artists
LGBT mixed martial artists
Ultimate Fighting Championship female fighters
People from Vila Velha
Sportspeople from Espírito Santo